Inphasion is Papa John Creach's seventh solo album and his last with DJM Records.  Creach would not record another studio album until 1992.

Track listing

Side One
"Inphasion" – 4:33
"Night Fire" – 4:49
"To Fill the Need" – 4:38
"Hezakiah" – 4:04
"Montuno Grande" – 3:21

Side Two
"All the World Loves a Winner" – 4:07
"Somehow She Knows" – 4:06
"Silver Bird" – 6:03
"Flow with the Feeling" – 4:48
"Southern Strut" – 2:39

Personnel
Papa John Creach – fiddle, lead vocals
Steve Haberman – keyboards, Brahms Interlude on "Silver Bird"
Bryan "Bug" Tilford – bass, lead vocals on "Silver Bird"
Mark "Mujel" Leon – drums, percussion
Joey Brasler – guitar
Reid King - acoustic guitar, violin sound architect and vocals

Additional Personnel
Michael Garrard – synthesizer on "Inphasion"
Bob Zimitti - Percussion
Johnny "Guitar" Watson – solo guitar on "All the World Loves a Winner"
Dr. John – piano, organ on "All the World Loves a Winner" and "Southern Strut"
Polly Cutter – background vocals on "All the World Loves a Winner"
Joey Carbone – rhythm piano on "Silver Bird"
David LaFlamme – fiddle on "Silver Bird"
Darcus – vocals on "Flow with the Feeling"
Charlie Daniels – fiddle duet with Papa John on "Southern Strut"
The Silver Fish (David Silver, Juanita Curiel, Ernestine Goldstein) – background vocals

Papa John Creach albums
Inphasion
DJM Records albums